Nicodemus Mill Complex is a historic home and mill complex located at Keedysville, Washington County, Maryland, United States. It consists of a dated 1810 -story, five-bay stone house with a mid-19th-century brick service wing, the ruins of a grist mill built about 1829, and an extensive complement of 19th-century domestic and agricultural outbuildings including a stone springhouse, stone-end bank barn, brick out kitchen, frame wash house, and a stuccoed stone secondary dwelling.  It is an intact representative example of the type of farmstead characteristic of the region during the 19th century.

It was listed on the National Register of Historic Places in 2001.

References

External links
, including photo from 2000, at Maryland Historical Trust

Houses on the National Register of Historic Places in Maryland
Houses completed in 1810
Houses in Washington County, Maryland
Grinding mills in Maryland
National Register of Historic Places in Washington County, Maryland
Grinding mills on the National Register of Historic Places in Maryland
1810 establishments in Maryland